See Elm Creek (Nueces River tributary) for the tributary of the Nueces River, in Maverick County, Texas.

Elm Creek, is one of two streams of that name in Kinney County and Maverick County, Texas.  Elm Creek joins the Rio Grande about 4 miles downstream from Elm Creek, Texas, and 1.1 miles up river from Eagle Pass, Texas.  Its source is just north of the Kinney County line, south of Spofford, Texas.

References

Tributaries of the Rio Grande
Bodies of water of Maverick County, Texas
Rivers of Kinney County, Texas